Hermenias semicurva is a moth of the family Tortricidae. It is found in Assam in India and in Vietnam.

References

Moths described in 1912
Eucosmini